Anna-Clara and Her Brothers (Swedish: Anna-Clara och hennes bröder) is a 1923 Swedish silent drama film directed by Per Lindberg and starring Ann Britt Ohlson, Carl Browallius, Hilda Borgström and Linnéa Hillberg.

Cast
 Ann Britt Ohlson as Anna-Clara
 Stig Herlitz as 	Emmanuel
 Carl Browallius as Anna-Clara's Father
 Hilda Borgström as 	Anna-Clara's Mother
 Linnéa Hillberg as 	Maid
 Margit Manstad as 	Young Woman	
 Karin Swanström as 	Aunt
 Lill-Tollie Zellman as 	Astrid

References

Bibliography
 Qvist, Per Olov & von Bagh, Peter. Guide to the Cinema of Sweden and Finland. Greenwood Publishing Group, 2000.

External links

1923 films
1923 drama films
Swedish drama films
Swedish silent feature films
Swedish black-and-white films
Films directed by Per Lindberg
1920s Swedish-language films
Silent drama films
1920s Swedish films